Sergeant William Norman Holmes  (born 1896, date of death unknown) was a World War I flying ace credited with eight aerial victories.

Between 11 March and 8 July 1918, while serving as an observer/gunner in No. 62 Squadron RAF, flying the Bristol F.2b fighter, he accounted for eight enemy aircraft; one Fokker D.VII, three Fokker Dr.I and four Albatros D.V. For his first three victories his pilot was Second Lieutenant S. W. Symons, for the fourth and fifth, Sergeant Frank Johnson, and for the last three one each with Captain Thomas L. Purdom, Lieutenant Douglas Savage and Captain William Ernest Staton. He was awarded the Military Medal on 12 June 1918.

References

1896 births
Year of death missing
Royal Flying Corps soldiers
People from Selby
Recipients of the Military Medal
British World War I flying aces
Military personnel from Yorkshire
Royal Air Force personnel of World War I
Royal Air Force airmen